M. indica may refer to:
 Macrochlamys indica, an air-breathing land snail species
 Makaira indica, the black marlin, a fish species found in tropical and subtropical Indo-Pacific oceans
 Mangifera indica, the mango, a tree species
 Melicope indica, a plant species endemic to India
 Mirocaris indica, a crustacean species
 Moschiola indica, the Indian spotted chevrotain, an even-toed ungulate species found in India

Synonyms
 Madhuca indica, a synonym for Madhuca longifolia, a tropical tree species found in India
 Masoniella indica, a synonym for Acrophialophora fusispora, a fungal pathogen species
 Melilotus indica, a synonym for Melilotus indicus, a yellow-flowered herb species native to northern Africa, Europe and Asia

See also
 Indica (disambiguation)